ThinkEquity LLC is a U.S. investment banking firm focusing on performing IPO's, Secondaries, At-the-Market (ATM) programs, selected private placements, PIPEs, Debt Placements and M&A Advisory services. 

Previously, ThinkEquity was owned by Peter Donovan and based in San Francisco, California.  ThinkEquity was founded in 2001 by Michael T. Moe and Deborah H. Quazzo as a growth focused research-centric investment bank. In April 2007, the firm was acquired by Panmure Gordon, a London-based investment bank. After the merger, the US division of firm used THNK as its underwriter ID but assumed the name ThinkEquity LLC, A Panmure Gordon Company as its company name. On October 17, 2012, the company announced that it was closing its stock-trading business and would be transferring its remaining investment-banking unit to another firm. Three weeks later, on November 7, the company filed for Chapter 7 liquidation.

Six years later in April 2018, the company re-emerged as ThinkEquity, a Division of Fordham Financial Management, Inc., subsequently merged with Fordham Financial and now “ThinkEquity”.

Offices
Since re-emerging in 2018, offices are located in New York City.

The original ThinkEquity had offices in San Francisco, New York, Minneapolis, Boston, Chicago, Shanghai, and Chennai, India.

Areas of business
Today's ThinkEquity focuses on performing IPO's, Secondaries, At-the-Market (ATM) programs, selected private placements, PIPEs, Debt Placements and M&A Advisory services. 

The prior ThinkEquity had the following areas of business:

Research: 22 senior research analysts, more than 280 companies under coverage as of January 2007 
Investment banking: full suite of M&A and equity services
Institutional brokerage
Wealth management

References

Investment banks in the United States
Financial services companies established in 2001
Banks established in 2001